Jean-Baptiste Robie (1821–1910) was a Belgian painter who specialised in flower painting, and later seascapes, landscapes and Oriental scenes.
 
He was born in Brussels, the son of a smith, and was initially self-taught. With the encouragement of his friend the artist Théodore Fourmois he later began studying at the Académie Royale des Beaux-Arts in Brussels with Balthazar-François Tasson (later Tasson-Snel) and exhibited at the Brussels Salon from 1843 to 1875, as well as at the Paris Salon and elsewhere.

He also wrote many travel books based on his extensive travels as far as India.

Notes and references

Further reading
 Bénézit, E., 1976: Dictionnaire critique et documentaire des peintres. Paris: Librairie Gründ 
 Bénézit, E., 1976: Dictionnaire des Peintres, Sculpteurs, Dessinateurs et Graveurs. Paris: Librairie Gründ 
 De Taeye, Edmond Louis, 1894-97: Les artistes belges contemporains. Brussels
 Flippo, W.G., 1981: Lexicon of the Belgian Romantic Painters. Antwerp
 Marchal, E., 1911: Notice sur Jean Robie, in: Annuaire de l’Académie Royale de Belgique, pp 177–190. Classe des Beaux-Arts
 Op De Beeck, E.: Un musée indien à Saint-Gillis. Oeuvre du peintre Jean Robie, in: Le Folklore Brabançon, nr. 162 (1964), pp 232–251* Thieme, U., &  Becker, F., 1980-86: Allgemeines Lexikon der bildenden Künstler von der Antike bis zur Gegenwart. Reprint of 1907 edition. 37 vols. Leipzig: Veb E.A. Seemann Verlag
 Vandevivere, I.. in: Biographie Nationale, 33, Brussel, (1965–66)

1821 births
1910 deaths
Artists from Brussels
19th-century Belgian painters
19th-century Belgian male artists
Académie Royale des Beaux-Arts alumni
Flower artists